John Albert McShane (August 25, 1850 – November 10, 1923) was an American Democratic Party politician. He was the first Democrat to be elected to the United States House of Representatives from Nebraska.

McShane was born in New Lexington, Ohio, on August 25, 1850. In 1871, he moved to the Wyoming Territory, and in 1874 he moved to Omaha, Nebraska. He started out in the livestock business but eventually became a director of the First National Bank of Omaha.

McShane was elected to the Nebraska state house of representatives in 1880 and to the state senate in 1882, serving there until 1886. That year he ran for and won the seat in Nebraska's 1st congressional district, serving in the Fiftieth United States Congress from March 4, 1887, to March 3, 1889.

After retirement McShane worked against the right of women to vote. He was a member of the Nebraska Men's Association Opposed to Woman Suffrage, which desired to restrict voting to white men of high social class.

McShane died in Omaha on November 10, 1923; he was buried in Holy Sepulchre Cemetery in Omaha.

References

 
 
 
 

1850 births
1923 deaths
Democratic Party members of the Nebraska House of Representatives
Democratic Party Nebraska state senators
People from New Lexington, Ohio
Democratic Party members of the United States House of Representatives from Nebraska